Beechersville is an unincorporated community in Adams County, Pennsylvania, United States. It is located off Cherry Street where Gettysburg Street becomes Mummasburg Road, adjacent to the borough of Arendtsville.

References

Unincorporated communities in Adams County, Pennsylvania
Unincorporated communities in Pennsylvania